Fig Leaves is a 1926 American silent comedy film directed by Howard Hawks, released by Fox Film Corporation, and starring George O'Brien and Olive Borden. The film had a sequence, a fashion show, filmed in Technicolor. A print of the film survives in the film archive of the Museum of Modern Art.

Plot
A married couple is juxtaposed in the Garden of Eden and in modern New York City. The Garden of Eden humorously depicts Adam (played by George O'Brien) and Eve (played by Olive Borden) awoken by a Flintstones-like coconut alarm clock and Adam reading the morning news on giant stone tablets. In the modern day, the biblical serpent is replaced by Eve's gossiping neighbor and Eve becomes a sexy flapper and fashion model when Adam is at work.

Cast
 George O'Brien as Adam Smith
 Olive Borden as Eve Smith
 Phyllis Haver as Alice Atkins
 George Beranger as Josef André (as André de Beranger)
 William Austin as André's assistant
 Heinie Conklin as Eddie McSwiggen
 Eulalie Jensen as Madame Griswald

See also
List of early color feature films

References

External links

1926 films
1920s color films
Silent American comedy films
American silent feature films
Films directed by Howard Hawks
Films set in New York City
Fox Film films
Garden of Eden
Surviving American silent films
Silent films in color
1926 comedy films
Early color films
Flappers
Cultural depictions of Adam and Eve
Films about modeling
1920s American films